The Danish Jersey is a modern Danish breed of dairy cattle. It derives from approximately 5200 head of Jersey cattle imported to Denmark from the island of Jersey between about 1896 and 1909. It is the most numerous population of Jersey cattle in Europe and constitutes approximately 13% of the Danish dairy herd.

Characteristics 

Danish Jerseys are smaller in stature than other dairy breeds (115-120 cm tall). They are fawn in colour with white markings not being uncommon. Coat colours will vary from lighter to dark brown, almost black. Darker brown can be found on their extremities (nose, feet, ears, and tail). Cows can weigh around 350-425 kg while bulls can weigh around 500-600 kg. Males have usually a darker coat than females.

Industry 
2016 Danish Jersey production statistics are on an average per cow per year basis. Total milk: 7,359 kg. Total fat: 434 kg. Fat percentage: 5.90%. Total protein: 305 kg. Protein percentage: 4.14%.

References

Further reading 

 I. Tapio, S. Värv, J. Bennewitz, J. Maleviciute, E. Fimland, Z. Grislis, T. H. E. Meuwissen, I. Miceikiene, I. Olsaker, H. Viinalass, J. Vilkki, J. Kantanen (2006). Prioritization for Conservation of Northern European Cattle Breeds Based on Analysis of Microsatellite Data. Conservation Biology. 20 (6): 1768–1779. .

Dairy cattle breeds
Cattle breeds originating in Denmark
Cattle breeds